Almoloya is one of the 84 municipalities of Hidalgo, in central-eastern Mexico. The municipal seat lies at Almoloya.  The municipality covers an area of 282.7 km².

As of 2005, the municipality had a total population of 10,638. 

During the colonial period Almoloya was part of the corregimiento of Apa y Tepeapulco.  The church of Concepcion Almoloya was established by 1697.

References

Municipalities of Hidalgo (state)
Populated places in Hidalgo (state)